Skottinden is a mountain in the Lofoten archipelago, in Nordland county, Norway. It is located on the southwestern part of the island of Vestvågøya in Vestvågøy Municipality.

The southern ridge of Skottinden has several lesser summits: Sengestokken, Blåtinden, and Munkan.

References

Vestvågøy
Mountains of Nordland